The cantons of Metz are administrative divisions of the Moselle department, in northeastern France. Since the French canton reorganisation which came into effect in March 2015, the city of Metz is subdivided into 3 cantons. Their seat is in Metz.

Population

References

Cantons of Moselle (department)